Sir Thomas Elder's proposal for scholarships in music performance, tenable at the Conservatorium, was accepted by the Council of the University of Adelaide in 1897.
There are five categories of performance for which Elder Scholarships may be awarded each year by the board of the Elder Conservatorium, which entitle the holder to three years' free tuition in their principal subjects and in such secondary subjects as the director of the Conservatorium may approve.

Elder Scholarship — partial list of recipients

Piano
1898: Elsie M. Hamilton
Maude Mary Puddy — special mention

 1899: Maude Mary Puddy

1908: L. A. H. "Harry" Brose
1911: Dorothy Oldham
when? Ariel Shearer
1916: Myrtle Gwendoline Adamson
1919: Alice Meegan
1924: Peggy Palmer
1927: Betty Froome Puddy
1930: Winifred Louise "Wynne" Fisher
1936: Maurine Bonython
1947: Ashleigh Hambridge Tobin
1954: Shirley Curry

Violin
1898: Nora Kyffin Thomas
1902: Eugene Alderman
1906: Daisy Kennedy
1907: Bertha Jones
1909: Hilda Marie Reimann, daughter of Gotthold Reimann
1912: Erica Chaplin (aged 13)
1916: Tryphena Grace Pyne
1922: Edward Black
1929: George Hooker
1933: Teresa Audrey Commane
1947: Beatrice Jane Allgrove
1954: I. Beckler

Violoncello
1904: Fritz Homburg
1920: Melville W. J. Williams
1927: John O'Connor McCabe
1935: Beatrice Ellen Pether

Organ
1912: Alfred Bampton
1924: Arnold Carey Farley
1928: Norman Chinner
1930: Gordon Bowen
1936: Clarence Black Black began his music studies while a longterm hospital inpatient.
1937: Clifford Reginald Bevan He was a student of Ernst Koch and Maude Puddy.
1940: Colin Holmes
1947: John Murray Gordon
1954: P. Cooper

Singing
1906: May Clytie Hine
1908: two awarded
Muriel E. Cheek
Walter J. Wood (special tenor prize)
1909: Francis H. Halls
1916: two awarded
Hilda Simcock (contralto)
Annie Vera Thrush
1919: three awarded
Valda Harvey
Raymond Wood
Reginald Thrush (special tenor prize)
1929: Geraldine Cash
1931: Mavis Beryl Kekwick
1936: Mary Constance Dempster

Eugene Alderman Scholarship
The Alderman Scholarship was founded 1908 by Eugene Alderman, and after his death revived as a memorial from funds raised for the purpose, and in this incarnation was awarded concurrently with the Elder Scholarship, for students of violin (for preference), otherwise violoncello, pianoforte, organ, or singing. It was originally for three years' tuition at the Elder Conservatorium, but later for a cash amount of $18 10s. (around $1000 in today's values).

See also 
Elder Overseas Scholarship to Royal College of Music, London

References 

1898 establishments in Australia
Awards established in 1898
Australian music awards